The USC Scripter Award (Scripter) is the name given to an award presented annually by the University of Southern California (USC) to honor both authors and screenwriters. Starting in 1988, the USC Libraries Board of Councilors award the year's best film adaptation of a printed work, recognizing the original author and the screenwriter. 

In 2016, a second Scripter award, for episodic series adaption, was added. The Literary Achievement Award honors significant contributions to storytelling across form, genre, and medium. The Ex Libris Award recognizes long-time supporters of the USC Libraries. The latter two awards are presented on an occasional basis. Per the Scripter Awards website, "Scripter celebrates writers and writing, collaboration, and the profound results of transforming one artistic medium into another. It stands as an emblem of libraries’ ability to inspire creative and scholarly achievement."

Film

1980s

1990s

2000s

2010s

2020s

Television

2010s

2020s

Literary Achievement

 2008 – Steven Zaillian
 2009 – Michael Chabon
 2010 – Eric Roth
 2011 – Dennis Lehane
 2012 – Paul Haggis
 2013 – Diana Ossana and Larry McMurtry
 2014 – Robert Towne
 2015 – Walter Mosley
 2018 – Francis Ford Coppola
 2020 – Susan Orlean
 2022 – Barry Jenkins

Ex Libris

 2015 – Elaine Leventhal
 2017 – Kathleen McCarthy Kostlan
 2018 – Valerie and Ronald Sugar
 2019 – George E. Isaacs
 2020 – Glenn Sonnenberg
 2021 – Greg Lucas

See also
 Academy Award for Best Adapted Screenplay
 BAFTA Award for Best Adapted Screenplay
 Writers Guild of America Award for Best Adapted Screenplay

References

External links
 
 

American film awards
Screenwriting awards for film
Scripter Award
Awards established in 1988
1988 establishments in California